Pia de Solenni is a theologian who formerly served as the chancellor of the Roman Catholic Diocese of Orange in California.
Solenni is an alumna of Thomas Aquinas College where she earned a Bachelor of Arts degree in Liberal Arts-Great Books, and of the Pontifical University of Saint Thomas Aquinas, Angelicum, where she earned a Bachelor of Sacred Theology. Subsequently, she earned a doctorate in theology from the Pontifical University of the Holy Cross in Rome; for this work, she received the 2001 Award of the Pontifical Academies, presented by John Paul II.  Dr. de Solenni has worked at the Family Research Council.

Her work has appeared in The Wall Street Journal, The Washington Post, and National Catholic Reporter, and she has appeared on CNN, ABC News, MSNBC, Hardball with Chris Matthews, The O’Reilly Factor, and other television programs.

References

External links
 Pia de Solenni at Patheos
 Dr. Pia de Solenni, "The Notion of Beauty" (2005)
 

Year of birth missing (living people)
Thomas Aquinas College alumni
Pontifical University of Saint Thomas Aquinas alumni
Pontifical University of the Holy Cross alumni
Living people
20th-century American Roman Catholic theologians
Women Christian theologians
American women journalists
Christian feminist theologians
Feminist theorists
American feminists
21st-century American Roman Catholic theologians
21st-century American non-fiction writers
Catholic feminists
21st-century American women writers